The following list of countries by labour productivity ranks countries by their labour productivity (also called workforce productivity). Labour productivity is the gross domestic product generated per hour of working time.

List 
Different countries by labour productivity per working hour in 2017 International dollar according to Our World in Data.

Historical development 

Different countries by development of labour productivity since 1970 according to the OECD.

See also 
 Productivity
 Workforce productivity
 List of countries by average annual labor hours
 List of countries by average wage
 List of countries by minimum wage

References 

Labour productivity
 list